Donald Edward Lee (born February 26, 1934) is a former pitcher in Major League Baseball who played for the Detroit Tigers (1957–58), Washington Senators / Minnesota Twins (1959–62), Los Angeles Angels (1962–65), Houston Astros (1965–66) and Chicago Cubs (1966). Lee batted and threw right-handed. He is the son of former major league pitcher Thornton Lee.

Lee attended University of Arizona. Signed by the Tigers as an amateur free agent in 1956, he debuted in the 1957 season. After two years with the Tigers, he was sent to the Senators. In 1962 Lee went to the Angels. He finished his career with the Cubs in 1966. Lee was a journeyman pitcher who divided his playing time jumping between the rotation and the bullpen. His most productive season came in 1962 with Minnesota and the Angels, when he compiled career-highs in victories (11), strikeouts (102), shutouts (2) and innings pitched.

On September 2, 1960, Lee surrendered a home run to Ted Williams in the first game of a doubleheader between the Senators and Boston Red Sox. 21 years before, in his rookie season, Williams hit a home run off Don's father Thornton Lee, then with the Chicago White Sox, on September 17, 1939. With this feat, Williams became the only player in major league history to hit home runs against a father and son.

In a nine-season career, Lee posted a 40–44 record with 467 strikeouts, a 3.61 ERA, 11 saves, and  innings in 244 games played (97 as a starter).

See also
 List of second-generation Major League Baseball players

References

External links

Don Lee MLB Baseballbiography.com

1934 births
Living people
All-American college baseball players
Arizona Wildcats baseball players
Augusta Tigers players
Baseball players from Arizona
Birmingham Barons players
Boston Red Sox scouts
Chicago Cubs players
Charleston Senators players
Detroit Tigers players
Houston Astros players
Los Angeles Angels players
Major League Baseball pitchers
Minnesota Twins players
New York Yankees scouts
Oklahoma City 89ers players
People from Globe, Arizona
Phoenix Giants players
San Diego Padres scouts
Tacoma Cubs players
Washington Senators (1901–1960) players
Williston Oilers players
Arizona Wildcats baseball coaches